DART Ukrainian Airlines, was a Ukrainian airline headquartered in Kyiv and based at Kyiv International Airport (Zhuliany). In April 2018, the airline ceased all operations.

History 
DART Ukrainian Airlines was established in 1997 and offered scheduled and charter flights for passengers and cargo as well as aircraft leasing. In November 2016, DART expanded its operations by adding a single Boeing 737-300 to its fleet. The United States of America proposed sanctions against DART. The airline ceased operations in April 2018.

Destinations
DART Ukrainian Airlines operated scheduled and charter flights to the following destinations:

Albania
Tirana - Tirana International Airport

Georgia
Tbilisi - Tbilisi International Airport

Greece
Athens - Athens International Airport

Ukraine
Kyiv - Kyiv International Airport (Zhuliany) base
Odessa - Odesa International Airport seasonal charter

Montenegro
Tivat - Tivat Airport seasonal charter

Fleet

As of November 2017, the DART Ukrainian Airlines fleet comprised the following aircraft:

References

External links

Official website

Defunct airlines of Ukraine
Airlines established in 1997
Airlines disestablished in 2018
Defunct charter airlines
Ukrainian companies established in 1997